Fair Park Coliseum is an 8,513-seat multi-purpose arena in Dallas, Texas (USA) on the Fair Park grounds. It was home to the Dallas Black Hawks ice hockey team and  Dallas Chaparrals basketball team.  It was built in 1955. It was also home to the new ABA's Dallas Generals for the 2009–2010 season before the franchise folded.

The State Fair Coliseum was the home of the Rodeo Cowboys Association’s inaugural National Finals Rodeo in 1959, and remained there through 1961. 

The Dallas Tornado soccer club hosted the four-team regionals of the 1975 NASL Indoor tournament. 

During the 1984 Dallas Grand Prix Formula One race held at Fair Park, the Coliseum doubled as the pit paddock for the Formula One teams in the Grand Prix.

From March 26, 2011 to 2013, the Coliseum was home to Dallas' own women's roller derby league, Assassination City Roller Derby of the Women's Flat Track Derby Association.

References

External links
Fair Park Coliseum website

American Basketball Association (2000–present) venues
f
Indoor ice hockey venues in the United States
Sports venues in Dallas
Dallas Chaparrals venues
North American Soccer League (1968–1984) indoor venues
Indoor arenas in Texas
Fair Park